The 2008 Billabong Pro Teahupoo surfing competition was held at Teahupo'o in Tahiti. The winner was Bruno Santos of Brazil.

Round 1

Round 2

Round 3

Round 4

Quarter finals

Semi finals

Final

References
 Site Billabong

Tahiti Pro
2008 in surfing
2008 in French Polynesian sport